Alexander Jenkins may refer to:

J. Alexander (model) (born 1958), American reality television personality and model
Alexander M. Jenkins (1802–1864), American politician